Lunatic is the second studio album by South African rock band Kongos. It was released independently by Tokoloshe on December 28, 2012. After signing with Epic Records, they re-released the album on February 25, 2014.

Track listing

Personnel
Adapted from the Lunatic liner notes.

Kongos
 Dylan Kongos - lead vocals (1,2,4,5,8,9,12), bass, pedal-steel guitar (2), acoustic guitar, programming, backing vocals
Johnny Kongos - accordion, piano, synths, programming, backing vocals
 Jesse Kongos - drums, percussion, programming, lead vocals (3,6,7,10,11), backing vocals
 Danny Kongos - guitar, backing vocals

Artwork
Kongos - artwork
Danny Kongos - photography

Production
Kongos - producer, recording, mixing
Jesse Kongos - mastering

Additional musician
John Kongos - executive producer, additional backing vocals

Charts

Weekly charts

Year-end charts

References

2012 debut albums
Epic Records albums
Kongos (band) albums